KRKT-FM is a commercial country music radio station in Albany, Oregon, United States, broadcasting to the Albany–Corvallis–Lebanon, Salem, and Eugene–Springfield, Oregon areas, also known as the Willamette Valley area, on 99.9 FM.

Translators
KRKT-FM broadcasts on the following translators:

External links
KRKT official website

RKT
Country radio stations in the United States
Albany, Oregon
1977 establishments in Oregon
Radio stations established in 1977